Alexander Roy (born 4 September 1974) is an English former professional darts player who competed in events of the Professional Darts Corporation (PDC). He used the nickname Ace of Herts for his matches and was formerly with Dave Holland Management. Roy's entrance music was "Burn in My Light" by Mercy Drive, which was the former theme of professional wrestler Randy Orton. In the early 2000s, Roy was inside the PDC's top 8 on the Order of Merit.

PDC career

Roy made his first impression on the darts circuit at the 1998 Dutch Open by reaching the semi-finals. He made his World Championship debut in 1999 but lost his first match to Rod Harrington. His overall record in the World Championship was quite disappointing, winning just three matches in his first eight attempts – but four times he has reached the last 16.

His record in the other televised PDC major tournaments has been slightly better with quarter final appearances at the World Matchplay in 2000 and 2003 and also at the UK Open in 2005 and 2006.

Roy won his first PDC title in March 2004 by beating Wayne Mardle at the JR+Vauxhall Holiday Park 128 Plus Classic and in May 2004 he reached the final of the Antwerp Open, losing to Colin Lloyd. In the following March he took his first Pro Tour (non-televised) title at the North West Regional Final of the UK Open beating Ronnie Baxter in the final. He has reached two other PDC non-televised finals since – the 2006 Sheppey Classic (losing 5–6 to Colin Osborne) and the 2007 Welsh Players Championship, when he beat Phil Taylor in the last 32 before losing the final to Raymond van Barneveld. He avenged that defeat to van Barneveld the following month at the Irish Players Championship before losing to Adrian Lewis in the quarter finals.

In October 2008 Roy won his first PDC title since March 2005 with victory at the Scottish Players Championship event in Irvine, beating Denis Ovens in a deciding leg in the final with a 161 checkout.

In 2017, Roy qualified for the UK Open through the amateur qualifiers, maintaining his record of qualifying for every UK Open since the inaugural event in 2003. He is one of eight players to have qualified for every event.

Roy quit the PDC in 2018.

Outside darts

Roy is married and has two children. He enjoys fishing and is a supporter of football club Liverpool F.C. Roy makes his main living as a builder.

World Championship performances

PDC

 1999: 1st Round (lost to Rod Harrington 0–3) (sets) 
 2000: 2nd Round (lost to Alan Warriner-Little 0–3)
 2001: 2nd Round (lost to Dave Askew 2–3)
 2002: 1st Round (lost to Colin Lloyd 2–4)
 2003: 2nd Round (lost to Denis Ovens 1–4)
 2004: 4th Round (lost to Alan Warriner-Little 3–4)
 2005: 3rd Round (lost to Phil Taylor 0–4)
 2006: 1st Round (lost to Alan Tabern 2–3)
 2007: 2nd Round (lost to Roland Scholten 3–4)
 2008: 3rd Round (lost to John Part 0–4)
 2009: 1st Round (lost to Kevin McDine 1–3)
 2010: 1st Round (lost to Wayne Jones 1–3)
 2011: 1st Round (lost to Mark Dudbridge 1–3)

Performance timeline

References

External links
Roy on the Darts Database

English darts players
1974 births
Living people
Professional Darts Corporation former tour card holders
PDC ranking title winners